

125001–125100 

|-id=071
| 125071 Lugosi ||  || Béla Lugosi (1883–1956), Hungarian actor known for his portrayal of Bram Stoker's classic vampire story Count Dracula in the 1927 Broadway production and subsequent 1931 theatrical version. || 
|-id=076
| 125076 Michelmayor ||  || Michel Mayor (born 1942) is a Swiss astrophysicist at Geneva University. || 
|}

125101–125200 

|-bgcolor=#f2f2f2
| colspan=4 align=center | 
|}

125201–125300 

|-bgcolor=#f2f2f2
| colspan=4 align=center | 
|}

125301–125400 

|-bgcolor=#f2f2f2
| colspan=4 align=center | 
|}

125401–125500 

|-id=473
| 125473 Keisaku ||  || Keisaku Ninomiya (1804–1862), a Japanese medical doctor who studied Western medicine and pharmaceutics under the German doctor Philipp Franz von Siebold in Nagasaki || 
|-id=476
| 125476 Frangarcia ||  || Francisco Garcia (born 1959), Spanish amateur astronomer || 
|}

125501–125600 

|-id=592
| 125592 Buthiers ||  || Buthiers Observatory , where this minor planet was discovered by French astronomer Jean-Claude Merlin || 
|}

125601–125700 

|-bgcolor=#f2f2f2
| colspan=4 align=center | 
|}

125701–125800 

|-id=718
| 125718 Jemasalomon ||  || Jean-Marc Salomon (1955–1981), French amateur astronomer; the 0.6-m telescope with which this minor planet was discovered is also named in his honour || 
|}

125801–125900 

|-bgcolor=#f2f2f2
| colspan=4 align=center | 
|}

125901–126000 

|-bgcolor=#f2f2f2
| colspan=4 align=center | 
|}

References 

125001-126000